Rosalind Frances Howard, Countess of Carlisle (née Stanley; 20 February 1845 – 12 August 1921), known as The Radical Countess, was a promoter of women's political rights and temperance movement activist.

Family 

The Countess of Carlisle was born probably at Alderley Park, Chelford in Cheshire. She was the tenth and last child of the Whig politician Edward Stanley, 2nd Baron Stanley of Alderley, and the women's education campaigner Henrietta Stanley, Baroness Stanley of Alderley. She was educated at home by private tutors. The Stanley family was exceptionally diverse in terms of religious convictions: Lord and Lady Stanley were high church Anglicans, their eldest son Henry was a Muslim, their third daughter Maude was a low church Anglican, their youngest son Algernon became a Roman Catholic bishop, their penultimate daughter Kate leaned towards atheism, while Rosalind herself identified as an agnostic.

Marriage 

On 4 October 1864, she married the painter George Howard, who became an active Liberal MP from 1879. She took part in election campaigns of her husband and father-in-law Charles by canvassing, but refrained from speaking publicly, which was considered improper for a woman. In sharp contrast to her moderate husband, however, Howard soon joined the radical left, denouncing William Ewart Gladstone's occupation of Egypt and campaigning for women's suffrage. She once responded to criticism of herself by saying: "Fanatics have done a lot of the world's work, and I don't mind being classed with the fanatics."

In its early days, the marriage was close and filled with romance. George showered Rosalind with love letters and nude sketches, but the couple gradually drifted apart. They shared a dislike for alcohol, but little else; when the Liberal Party split on the issue of Irish home rule, which Rosalind supported, George decided to side with his cousin, the Duke of Devonshire, and the Liberal Unionist Party. Due to their personal and political disagreements, the Howards spent most of their married life separated, with Rosalind preferring to stay at their country houses, Castle Howard and her favourite home, Naworth Castle.

Views and causes 

Despite being plagued by poor health, Howard made use of her organisational skills. She joined Liberal Party women's associations and the temperance movement, involved herself in the management of the extensive family estates and took part in local government. She took the temperance pledge in 1881 and started requiring teetotalism from her tenants and closing down public houses on her estates the next year. Howard gained further credit in 1889 when her husband succeeded his uncle William as 9th Earl of Carlisle, thereby also inheriting the family fortune, and she became known as Countess of Carlisle. In 1891, a United Kingdom Alliance official convinced Lady Carlisle to speak on the subject of temperance at a drawing-room meeting of women. She soon became a successful platform speaker and vice-president of the United Kingdom Alliance, as well as president of the North of England Temperance League in 1892.

In 1890, Lady Carlisle became a member of the Women's Liberal Federation and persuaded the organisation to support extending the suffrage to all women, but denounced Pankhurst suffragettes' violent methods. She presided over the federation from 1894 until 1902 and again from 1906 until 1915. She was elected president of the British Women's Temperance Association in 1903 and president of the World's Woman's Christian Temperance Association in 1906, retaining both offices until her death. Lady Carlisle disagreed with the policy of her predecessor, Lady Henry Somerset, and Thomas Palmer Whittaker, who, among other things, advocated compensating licence holders who lost their livelihoods due to temperance.

The Countess of Carlisle allied herself with a small group of Liberal MPs, including her son Geoffrey, her son-in-law Charles Henry Roberts, her secretary Leifchild Leif-Jones and her neighbour Sir Wilfrid Lawson. The Good Templars supported her policies, but she refused invitations to join the mostly working-class and lower middle-class organisation. 

When Lady Carlisle's daughter, Lady Dorothy Georgiana Howard, was attending Girton College, her closest college friends included archaeologist Gisela Richter and future candidate for Roman Catholic Sainthood Anna Abrikosova. During vacations, both were honored guests of Lady Carlisle at Castle Howard and Castle Naworth. 

Although she had opposed the South African War, Lady Carlisle firmly supported British resistance to the Germans in the First World War. The temperance movement and the Liberal Party had divided by then, leaving her without significant political influence. She supported H. H. Asquith despite his unwillingness to promote prohibition and opposed David Lloyd George's proposal to nationalise the drink trade during wartime. Though she worked hard to improve the working-class people's living conditions, she was an élitist who resented their role in democracy.

Death and legacy 
By the time Lord Carlisle died in 1911, Lady Carlisle's autocracy had estranged her from most of her children and friends. She strongly disapproved of her daughters' flirtatiousness and bitterly argued with her eldest son Charles, a Tory politician. For several years, Lady Carlisle refused to speak to her daughter Dorothy due to her marriage to the brewer Francis Henley (afterwards Baron Henley). Lady Henley later claimed that her mother was privately a tyrant, despite appearing at her best in public.

Her husband left most of the family property to her for life and instructed her to divide it among their children upon her death. Rosalind, Countess of Carlisle, died on 12 August 1921 at her home in Kensington Palace Gardens, having survived all her sons except for Geoffrey, and was cremated at Golders Green Crematorium four days later. Her ashes were interred alongside her husband's at Lanercost Priory on 18 August, with Geoffrey as the chief mourner. The surviving children found her last will and testament to be unfair and agreed to redivide the inheritance. Her daughter Cecilia succeeded her as president of the British Women's Temperance Association.

In popular culture
Lady Carlisle served as a model for Lady Britomart in George Bernard Shaw's play Major Barbara.

Issue 

Rosalind and George Howard had 11 children:

Charles James Stanley Howard, 10th Earl of Carlisle (8 March 1867 - 20 January 1912).
Hon. Hubert George Lyulph Howard (3 April 1871 - September 1898), killed at the Battle of Omdurman.
Hon. Christopher Edward Howard (2 June 1873 - 1 September 1896).
Hon. Oliver Howard (b. 14 March 1875) married Muriel Stephenson on 17 March 1900 and had issue
Hon. Geoffrey William Algernon Howard (12 February 1877 - 20 June 1935).
Hon. Michael Francis Stafford Howard (23 January 1880 - 9 October 1917) married Nora Hensman and had issue
Lady Mary Henrietta Howard (d. 2 September 1956) married Gilbert Murray on 30 November 1889 and had issue
Lady Cecilia Howard (d. 6 May 1947) married Charles Henry Roberts (d. 25 July 1959) on 7 April 1891 and had issue
Lady Dorothy Howard (d. 14 September 1968) married Francis Robert Eden (1877–1962) on 14 October 1913 and had issue
Lady Elizabeth Dacre Howard (born and died in 1883).
Lady Aurea Howard (b. 1884) married Denyss Chamberlaine Wace in 1923 and Major Thomas MacLeod OBE in 1928.

Arms

References

Bibliography
Dorothy Henley (1958) Rosalind Howard, Countess of Carlisle (Hogarth Press)
Charles Roberts (1962), The Radical Countess (Steel Bros)

External links
 NPG 6206; Rosalind Frances Howard, Countess of Carlisle at www.npg.org.uk Portrait held by National Portrait Gallery
 Death of Rosalind, Lady Carlisle - The Times, Saturday, 13 Aug 1921

1845 births
1921 deaths
Daughters of barons
Carlisle
British suffragists
British temperance activists
Women of the Victorian era
Rosalind
Rosalind
British Women's Temperance Association people
Burials in Cumbria